The North East Wales FA Junior Cup (known as the Horace Wynne Cup) is a football knockout tournament involving teams from in North Wales who play in leagues administered and associated with the North East Wales Football Association.

Previous winners
Information sourced from NEWFA Handbook 2017.

1970s

1971–72: – St Marys Ruabon
1972–73: – BICC
1973–74: – Buckley Rovers
1974–75: – Castell Alun Colts 
1975–76: – Coedpoeth SC
1976–77: – Cefn Albion 
1977–78: – Penley 
1978–79: – Chirk AAA
1979–80: – Castell Alun Colts

1980s

1980–81: – Tunnel Cement 
1981–82: – Grapes
1982–83: – Penycae
1983–84: – Penycae
1984–85: – Penycae
1985–86: – Overton Athletic
1986–87: – Bradley SC 
1987–88: – Bradley SC 
1988–89: – Penley 
1989–90: – New Broughton

1990s

1990–91: – Penley
1991–92: – Saltney CC
1992–93: – Saltney CC
1993–94: – Rhosddu
1994–95: – Rhostyllen/ Bersham Royal British Legion 
1995–96: – Llangollen Town
1996–97: – Bala Town  
1997–98: – Bradley Villa 
1998–99: – Borras– Park Albion
1999–2000: – The Hand Chirk

2000s

2000–01: – Cefn United 
2001–02: – Mynydd Isa
2002–03: – Rhostyllen United
2003–04: – Summerhill United
2004–05: – Brynteg Village
2005–06: – Venture
2006–07: – Penyffordd 
2007–08: – Penley
2008–09: – Garden Village
2009–10: – Penyffordd

2010s

2010–11: –  Saltney Town 
2011–12: –  Aston Park Rangers 
2012–13: –  Point of Ayr
2013–14: –  FC Queens Park
2014–15: –  Cefn Albion  
2015–16: –  Rhostyllen
2016–17: –  Cefn Mawr Rangers  
2017–18: –  Penyffordd Lions 
2018–19: –  Flint Mountain 
2019–20: – Competition not completed - Covid-19 pandemic

2020s

2020–21: – No competition - Covid-19 pandemic
2021–22: – FC Queens Park

Number of competition wins

 Penley – 4
 Penycae – 3
 Saltney CC/ Town – 3
 Bradley SC – 2
 Castell Alun Colts – 2
 Cefn Albion – 2
 FC Queens Park – 2
 Penyffordd – 2
 Aston Park Rangers – 1
 Bala Town – 1
 BICC – 1
 Borras Park Albion – 1
 Bradley Villa – 1
 Buckley Rovers – 1
 Brynteg Village – 1
 Cefn Mawr Rangers – 1
 Cefn United – 1
 Chirk AAA – 1
 Coedpoeth SC – 1
 Flint Mountain – 1
 Garden Village – 1
 Grapes – 1
 Llangollen Town – 1
 Mynydd Isa – 1
 New Broughton – 1
 Overton Athletic – 1
 Penyffordd Lions – 1
 Point of Ayr – 1
 Rhosddu – 1
 Rhostyllen – 1
 Rhostyllen/ Bersham Royal British Legion – 1
 Rhostyllen United – 1
 St Marys Ruabon – 1
 Summerhill United – 1
 The Hand – 1
 Tunnel Cement – 1
 Venture – 1

References

Football cup competitions in Wales
County Cup competitions
Football in Wales